Who is the Guilty? (sometimes Who is to Blame?) is a 1925 Georgian silent film directed by Alexandre Tsutsunava

Plot

The young farmer Siko (Kote Mikaberidze) wants to start a better life by working for an American circus. His family stays behind, but after he leaves his child dies.

Cast
 Kote Mikaberidze as Siko
 Tsetsilia Tsutsunava as Salikhe
 Nato Vachnadze as Pati
 Dimitri Kipiani as Besya

External links 
 

Soviet silent feature films
Soviet-era films from Georgia (country)
Georgian-language films
Soviet black-and-white films
Silent feature films from Georgia (country)
Black-and-white films from Georgia (country)